Christina Nilsson was a schooner that sank in Lake Michigan off Baileys Harbor, Wisconsin, on October 23, 1884. In 2003, the shipwreck site was added to the National Register of Historic Places.

History
The ship was built in Manitowoc, Wisconsin, at a cost of $23,000 and was named after Christina Nilsson.

On October 23, 1884, Christina Nilsson cleared Escanaba, Michigan, bound for Chicago, Illinois, with a cargo of pig iron. When a blizzard hit the area that day, her captain attempted to make port at Baileys Harbor, but, while still trying to navigate through the storm, Christina Nilsson struck a reef off Baileys Harbor and foundered. All crew members survived.

The ship's cargo was recovered, but attempts to salvage Christina Nilsson herself were unsuccessful. The wreck site has been investigated by the Wisconsin Historical Society and the Wisconsin Underwater Archaeology Association since 1997.

References

External links
Shipwrecks in Baileys Harbor with Russel Leiz by the Baileys Harbor Historical Society, Sevestopol TV, June 7, 2012

1880s ships
Ships built in Manitowoc, Wisconsin

Shipwrecks on the National Register of Historic Places in Wisconsin
Shipwrecks of the Wisconsin coast
Shipwrecks of Lake Michigan
Maritime incidents in October 1884
National Register of Historic Places in Door County, Wisconsin
Wreck diving sites in the United States